The 1907 Clemson Tigers football team represented Clemson Agricultural College—now known as Clemson University—as a member of the Southern Intercollegiate Athletic Association (SIAA) during the 1907 college football season. Led by Frank Shaughnessy in his first and only season as head coach, the team posted an overall record of 4–4 with a mark of 1–3 in SIAA play. Mac McLaurin was the team captain.

Schedule

References

Clemson
Clemson Tigers football seasons
Clemson Tigers football